Cysteine-rich secretory protein 2 is a cysteine-rich secretory protein that in humans is encoded by the CRISP2 gene.

References

External links

Further reading